Cholmeley Dering (1766–1836), of Cavendish Square, Middlesex and Brighton, Sussex, was an English politician.

Family
He was the second son of Sir Edward Dering, 6th Baronet. In 1799 he bought the recently built Howletts near Canterbury, Kent from Isaac Baugh.

He married in 1789 Charlotte Elizabeth, the daughter of Sir Joseph Yates and had one son.

Career
From 1794 he commanded a fencible regiment, the New Romsey corps of Fencible cavalry initially as major, later as lieutenant-colonel.
He was a Member (MP) of the Parliament of the United Kingdom for New Romney 5 November 1817 - 1818.

References

External links 
 

1766 births
1836 deaths
People from Brighton
People from the City of Westminster
UK MPs 1812–1818
Members of the Parliament of the United Kingdom for English constituencies
Younger sons of baronets